

Werner Ranck (25 October 1904 – 7 December 1989) was a general in the Wehrmacht of Nazi Germany during World War II.  He was a recipient of the Knight's Cross of the Iron Cross, awarded by for successful military leadership.

Ranck surrendered to the Soviet forces in May 1945 in the Courland Pocket.  Convicted as a war criminal in the Soviet Union, he was held until 1955.

Awards and decorations

 Knight's Cross of the Iron Cross on 2 March 1945 as Generalmajor and commander of 121. Infanterie-Division

References

Citations

Bibliography

 

1904 births
1989 deaths
Lieutenant generals of the German Army (Wehrmacht)
Military personnel from Hamburg
Reichswehr personnel
Recipients of the Gold German Cross
Recipients of the Knight's Cross of the Iron Cross
German prisoners of war in World War II held by the Soviet Union